Tutelo, also known as Tutelo–Saponi, is a member of the Virginian branch of Siouan languages that were originally spoken in the territory now known as Virginia and West Virginia in the United States. Some speakers of Tutelo migrated north to escape warfare. Traveling through North Carolina, Pennsylvania, New York, they finally settled in Ontario after the American Revolutionary War with the Cayuga (Iroqouian speakers) at what is now known as Six Nations of the Grand River First Nation.

Nikonha, the last fluent speaker in Tutelo country, died in 1871 at age 106. The year before, he had managed to impart about 100 words of vocabulary to the ethnologist Horatio Hale, who had visited him at the Six Nations Reserve. 

In 1753 the Tutelo had joined the Iroquois confederacy under the sponsorship of the Cayuga. Descendants living at Grand River spoke Tutelo well into the twentieth century, when it was recorded by Hale and other scholars including J. N. B. Hewitt, James Owen Dorsey, Leo J. Frachtenberg, Edward Sapir, Frank Speck, and Marianne Mithun. The last active speakers, a mother and daughter, died in a house fire shortly before Mithun's visit in 1982. The last native speaker, Albert Green, died some time after that.

Documentation 
Hale published a brief grammar and vocabulary in 1883 and confirmed the language as Siouan through comparisons with Dakota and Hidatsa. His excitement was considerable to find an ancient Dakotan language, which was once widespread among inland tribes in Virginia, to have been preserved on a predominantly Iroquoian-speaking reserve in Ontario. Previously, the only recorded information on the language had been a short list of words and phrases collected by Lieutenant John Fontaine at Fort Christanna in 1716, and a few assorted terms recorded by colonial sources, such as John Lederer, Abraham Wood, Hugh Jones, and William Byrd II. 

Hale noted the testimony of colonial historian Robert Beverley, Jr.--that the dialect of the Occaneechi, believed to be related to Tutelo, was used as a lingua franca by all the tribes in the region regardless of their first languages, and it was known to the chiefs, "conjurers," and priests of all tribes. These shamans used it in their ceremonies, just as Roman Catholic priests in Europe and the US used Latin. Hale's grammar also noted further comparisons to Latin and Ancient Greek. He remarked on the classical nature of Tutelo's rich variety of verb tenses available to the speaker, including what he remarked as an 'aorist' perfect verb tense, ending in "-wa".

James Dorsey, another Siouan linguist, collected extensive vocabulary and grammar samples around the same time as Hale, as did Hewitt a few years later. Frachtenberg and Sapir both visited the Six Nations Ontario reserve in the first decade of the 1900s and found that only a few Cayuga of Tutelo ancestry remembered a handful of Tutelo words. Speck did much fieldwork to record and preserve their cultural traditions in the 1930s, but found little of the speech remaining. Mithun managed to collect a handful of terms that were still remembered in 1980.

The language as preserved by these efforts is now believed to have been mutually intelligible with, if not identical to, the speech of other Virginia Siouan groups in general, including the Monacan and Manahoac and Nahyssan confederacies, as well as the subdivisions of Occaneechi, Saponi, etc. 

In the 21st century, descendants of the original native groups and others are interested in contemporary language revitalization. In 2021 the Living Tongues Institute for Endangered Languages assisted Tutelo activists in building a Living Dictionary for Tutelo-Saponi Monacan.

Phonology
Oliverio proposes the following analysis of the sound system of Tutelo:

Tutelo Consonants

Vowels
Tutelo has a standard vowel inventory for a Siouan language. Proto-Siouan *ũ and *ũː is lowered to /õ/ and /õː/, respectively.

Oral vowels

Nasal vowels

Grammar
Independent personal pronouns, as recorded by Dorsey, are: 
 1st sing. - Mima (I)
 2nd sing. - Yima (you)
 3rd sing. - Ima (he, she, it)

The pronoun Huk "all" may be added to form the plurals Mimahuk "we" and Yimahuk "ye", and "they" is Imahese.

In verbal conjugations, the subject pronouns are represented by various prefixes, infixes, and or suffixes, usually as follows:
 1st sing. - Ma- or Wa- (or -ma-, -wa-)
 2nd sing. - Ya- (-ya-)
 3rd sing. - (null; no affixes, simple verb)
 1st plur. - Mank- or Wa'en- (prefix only)
 2nd plur. - Ya- (-ya-) + -pui
 3rd plur. - --hle, -hne.

An example as given by Hale is the verb Yandosteka "love", and the infix is between yando- and -steka:
Yandowasteka, I love
Yandoyasteka, you love
Yandosteka, he or she loves
Mankyandosteka, we love
Yandoyastekapui, ye love
Yandostekahnese, they love.

The last form includes the common additional tense suffix -se, which literally conveys the progressive tense. There are also 'stative' classes of verbs that take the 'passive' (oblique) pronoun affixes (mi- or wi-, yi- etc.) as subjects. 

Additional tenses can be formed by the use of other suffixes including -ka (past), -ta (future), -wa (aorist or perfect), -kewa (past perfect), and -ma (perfect progressive). Rules for combining the suffixes with stems in final vowels are slightly complex.

References

External links
Tutelo Language and the Saponi/Tutelo Indian Tribe (Saponey, Haliwa-Saponi)
Swadesh list for Tutelo-Saponi on Wiktionary
OLAC resources in and about the Tutelo language
Tutelo-Saponi Monacan Living Dictionary

Indigenous languages of the North American eastern woodlands
Native American language revitalization
Western Siouan languages
Languages extinct in the 1980s
Extinct languages of North America
Indigenous languages of Maryland
Tutelo